Ansty may refer to:

Places in England
 Ansty, Dorset (including Higher Ansty, Lower Ansty, Little Ansty and Ansty Cross)
 Ansty, Warwickshire, village and civil parish
RAF Ansty, former Royal Air Force station
 Ansty, West Sussex, village
 Ansty, Wiltshire, village and civil parish
Ansty Preceptory, medieval monastery

See also
 Anstey (disambiguation)